The SYM DD50 (also known as the SYM Jolie or City Trek or in some markets as Super Pure) is a single-cylinder, oil injected two-stroke, automatic scooter manufactured by Taiwanese company SYM Motors.

Overview
The DD50 has continuously variable transmission, auto-choke, both a self-starter and kick starter, and auto-lubrication to simplify operation. Along with a speedometer, the front console has a fuel level gauge, and low oil (two-stroke oil) indicator. The DD50 weighs  dry. The front brake is a hydraulic disc, while the rear  is a drum. The under-seat luggage compartment is suitable for helmet storage.

References
Footnotes

Sources
Sym Scoota Jolie Model
Info on web.archive.org 

Motor scooters
Motorcycles of Taiwan
Mopeds
Two-stroke motorcycles